KBQQ (103.9 FM) is a radio station licensed to serve the community of Smiley, Texas. The station is owned by Rufus Resources, LLC, and airs a classic country format as part of a group of stations branded as the "No Bull Radio Network".

The station was assigned the KBQQ call letters by the Federal Communications Commission on April 7, 2016.

References

External links
 Official Website
 FCC Public Information File for KBQQ
 

BQQ (FM)
Radio stations established in 2019
2019 establishments in Texas
Classic country radio stations in the United States
Gonzales County, Texas